Happy Valley was a construction camp of trailer homes and hutments at the Clinton Engineer Works of the Manhattan Project in the 1940s. It was located near the K-25 gaseous diffusion plant in Oak Ridge, Tennessee, to lessen travelling time for the seventeen thousand construction men working there.

The Happy Valley settlement was dismantled in the early 1950s.

References

Oak Ridge, Tennessee
Former populated places in Tennessee